Michael C. "Mike" Riley (born April 16, 1955) is a Canadian curler originally from Winnipeg, Manitoba. He skipped his home province to a Brier championship in 1984.

Career
Riley has been to three Briers. In 1975, he played third for Rod Hunter and at the Brier that year, they finished with a 6-5 record, tied for fifth place. Riley returned to the Brier in 1984, skipping a team of Brian Toews, John Helston and Russ Wookey. The team finished the round robin with an 8-3 record, in 1st place, which gave them a bye to the final against Ontario's Ed Werenich. The Manitoba four-some defeated "the Wrench" by a score of 7-4. The team would then go on to represent Canada at the 1984 Air Canada Silver Broom, the World Curling Championships. They would finish the round robin with a 6-3 record, but lost in the semi-final against Switzerland's Peter Attinger, Jr. This result placed them in 4th position.

Riley returned to the Brier in 1986 with team mates Toews, Wookey and new lead Terry Henry. The team finished the event with a 6-5 record, missing the playoffs.

Riley's 1984 team was inducted into the Manitoba Curling Hall of Fame in 2009.

Personal life
As of 2009, Riley was living in Kelowna, British Columbia.  When he won the Brier, he was an investment counsellor.

References

 "Riley Appreciates Rest, Wendorf" - The Phoenix, April 7, 1984
 "Riley Finally Emerges" - The Leader Post, March 12, 1984

External links
 

Brier champions
Living people
Sportspeople from Kelowna
Curlers from Winnipeg
Canadian male curlers
1955 births